"Money" is a song by Australian pop rock duo Lime Cordiale, released on 1 February 2019 as the third single from their second studio album 14 Steps to a Better You (2020).

The song was polled at number 32 in Triple J's Hottest 100 of 2019. The song was certified gold in Australia in 2020.

Background
Oliver Leimbach said the track is about how money plays a big role in society and how it can be the source of more issues than solutions.

Release
"Money" was released for digital download and on streaming services on 1 February 2019.

Credits and personnel

Song credits
Adapted from the parent album's liner notes.

Musicians
Lime Cordiale
 Oliver Leimbach – vocals, guitar, bass, saxophone, trumpet, flute, clarinet, kazoo
 Louis Leimbach – vocals, guitar, bass, saxophone, trumpet, flute, clarinet, kazoo

Other musicians
 James Jennings – drums
 Felix Bornholdt – keyboards
 Nicholas Polovineo – trombone, trumpet, flugelhorn
 Lachlan Hamilton – saxophone

Technical
 Dave Hammer – production, mixing
 Brian Lucey at Magic Gardens Mastering – mastering

Artwork
 Louis Leimbach – artwork creation

Certifications

References

2019 singles
2019 songs
Lime Cordiale songs
Songs written by Louis Leimbach
Songs written by Oli Leimbach